Hongze, sometimes spelled Hungtse, may refer to:

 Lake Hongze, lake in Jiangsu Province, China
 Hongze County, in Jiangsu Province, China